Rubiana is a comune (municipality) in the Metropolitan City of Turin in the Italian region Piedmont, located about  northwest of Turin.

The municipality of Rubiana contains the frazioni (subdivisions, mainly villages and hamlets) Mompellato and Favella.

Rubiana borders the following municipalities: Viù, Condove, Val della Torre, Caprie, Villar Dora, and Almese.

References

External links
 Official website

Cities and towns in Piedmont